Samuel "Sam" William Lufkin (May 8, 1891 – February 19, 1952) was an American actor who usually appeared in small or bit roles in short comedy films.

Career
Born in Utah, Lufkin spent most of his career at the Hal Roach Studios where he made over 60 films.  In over half of these, he appeared alongside Laurel and Hardy, again mostly in small parts, but occasionally in more substantial roles, such as an irascible cop (The Music Box), or an irate motorist (Two Tars).  After Laurel and Hardy left Roach in 1940, the grim-faced Lufkin mostly appeared in further bit roles in Hollywood feature films before his death of uremia in 1952. His grave is located at Pierce Brothers Valhalla Memorial Park.

Selected filmography

References

External links

1891 births
1952 deaths
Male actors from Utah
American male film actors
American male silent film actors
Burials at Valhalla Memorial Park Cemetery
Deaths from kidney disease
Hal Roach Studios actors
20th-century American male actors
20th-century American comedians